Thamnolia papelillo is a species of whiteworm lichen in the family Icmadophilaceae. It was described as a new species in 2004 by Norwegian lichenologist Rolf Santesson. It is found in Peru, where it grows on grazed grass steppe. Until Santesson's publication, it had been considered a variety of Thamolia vermicularis. It differs from T. vermicularis in having flat and wide podetia and a distribution restricted to South America.

References

Pertusariales
Lichen species
Lichens described in 2004
Taxa named by Rolf Santesson
Fungi of South America